The Race to the Sky is a long-distance sled dog race held annually in Montana.  There are several divisions offered at different distances. The longest race was originally a  race but is currently .  It is a qualifying race for the Iditarod Trail Sled Dog Race and is sometimes called "The Iditarod of the Lower 48."

History
The race was first held in 1986 and was a 500 mile competition called the Governor's Cup Sled Dog Race. From the outset, it was a qualifying race for the Iditarod.  In 1989, the race organizers incorporated as Montana Sled Dog, LLC, a 501(c)(3) nonprofit.  That year, the race was temporarily renamed the Montana Centennial Sled Dog Race, honoring the centennial of Montana statehood. After that, it was called the Race to the Sky and other races with shorter distances were added to the program.  The 500 mile format was the longest United States sled dog race outside of Alaska. A  race was added in 1991, raised to 300 miles from 1993 to 1996. In 1997, the 500-mile race became a 350-mile race.  The shorter race became  for a time, and then a  race for adult competitors and a 100-mile race for youth competitors were offered.

The race commemorates the World War II sled dog training camp that operated about 15 miles west of Helena, Montana, the Camp Rimini War Dog Reception and Training Center.  The facility trained as many as 800 sled dogs as war dogs for a potential invasion of Norway, a plan that ultimately did not materialize. Instead, the sled dogs were assigned to search and rescue missions in Greenland, Canada and Alaska. Pack dogs were also trained at the facility and about 125 soldiers were taught mushing skills to become drivers.

Structure and route
The first leg of the 300-mile race begins with an official start at the site of former Camp Rimini, near Rimini, Montana and ends near Exit 138 of Interstate 15 at Elk Park near Butte, Montana.  The following day, the mushers and dogs are transported to Lincoln, Montana and the race restarts at that location. The 100-mile race also begins in Lincoln and finishes at Seeley Lake, Montana.  The 300-mile race competitors continue past Seeley Lake to a turn-around point at Owl Creek, where they return to Seeley Lake and then to Lincoln to finish.

There are a number of checkpoints along the way where the dog teams stop for examination and spectators can view the progress of the race. The specialized veterinary care for the competition dogs is provided by veterinarians who are part of the International Sled Dog Veterinary Medical Association. The 2014 race raised funds to support the United States War Dog Association

Participants in the Race to the Sky qualify to compete in the Iditarod.

Winners
Race to the Sky winners of 300, 350 or 500 mile race. Hometown and location information given for the year of their win.

See also

List of sled dog races
Dog sled
Sled dog
Devil's Brigade

References

External links
 

Dog sledding races